Devolved is an Australian technical death metal band led by drummer and lyricist John Sankey, originally from the Gold Coast, Queensland, but now based in Los Angeles. The band has released four full-length albums and has toured extensively throughout Australia, Europe, the United Kingdom, the United States and Japan.

History 
In 1998, drummer John Sankey decided to start a new extreme metal band based at the Gold Coast, Australia and began writing material with local guitarist Brett Noordin. They then added bassist and vocalist Joel Graham and lead guitarist Mark Walpole were recruited and the original Devolved line-up was complete. Over the next year Devolved recorded an EP titled 'Truth' and rapidly built a strong following due to their intense live performances, one of which caused one fan to suffer an epileptic seizure during their show, the band have since been forced to include a warning for such a reaction on all promotion materials and releases. In 2000 Devolved entered the studio to record their debut album 'Technologies', just prior to the recording sessions vocalist Nik Carpenter joined the band. The album was released in 2001 and immediately received widespread attention and acclaim, Devolved was voted Australian Metal Band of the Year by both listeners and staff at leading National radio network JJJ and the Roadrunner Records affiliated magazine 'Outsider' judged Technologies to be the Australian metal album of the year and Sankey was awarded as best metal drummer. Sankey was soon contacted by a number of drum Companies and he signed exclusive endorsement deals with Sabian Cymbals, Pro-Mark drum sticks, Axis Pedals, Aquarian drum heads and Premier drums.

At this time bass player Joel Graham was replaced for a short term by Leighton Kearns, who was then replaced by Wayde Dunn. Devolved toured extensively for 'Technologies' including appearances alongside Strapping Young Lad and Machine Head. Sankey also performed with Melbourne-based band Frankenbok filling in for their drummer who was injured on tours with Skinlab and Soilwork. Devolved soon returned to the studio to record an EP titled 'Automation 001' which featured 2 new tracks plus live songs and interactive bonus material. After its release in 2002 the band took their chaotic live show overseas to the UK and Europe where they performed shows with Opeth, Arch Enemy, Candlemass and many more. Vocalist Nik Carpenter was unceremoniously let go during this time when he became 'too home sick to continue the tour' and left in the middle of the night to fly back to Australia without warning leaving the band without a singer for the last handful of shows. Fortunately guitarist Brett Noordin stood in as vocalist for the remaining dates, needless to say Sankey fired Carpenter from the band immediately.

Upon returning to Australia Devolved performed with metal heavyweights Fear Factory, who had been Sankey's favorite band for many years. It was then that Sankey met FF guitarist Dino Cazares. Cazares had previously heard Devolved and was a fan of their music, the two struck up a mutual friendship and when Cazares left Fear Factory the following month he asked Sankey to fly to America to begin working on a new project with him which would become 'Divine Heresy'. Sankey spent the majority of 2003 in Los Angeles living with Cazares writing new music together, he then returned to Australia to focus on the next Devolved album which he wrote entirely with Noordin.

As a result of Devolved's success Sony Records offered the band an exclusive distribution deal which was previously unheard of for an extreme metal band. Sankey stated that he wanted this new album to showcase the band's technicality and experiment with irregular song structures and patterns. Although Nik Carpenter had been previously fired from the band he was re-hired on a temporary basis to record vocals on the new album (reportedly much to Sankey's discontent). Patrick Brown was also added to the live line-up as the band's sampler. 'Calculated' was released in Australia in 2004, and although it received very positive reviews Sankey says he was never happy with the production of the album due to strict time restraints by the Label. Devolved once again hit the road and toured aggressively playing many sold-out shows throughout Australia to support the release.

In 2005 the Roadrunner United All-stars album was released to celebrate the 25th anniversary of Roadrunner Records, the album included a song titled 'No Mas Control' which was written by Sankey and Dino Cazares, it featured Ill Nino vocalist Christian Machado. Sankey then made the decision to relocate Devolved to the US, he and Brett Noordin made the move to Los Angeles since it was the two of them who were writing all the band's music and lyrics, while the other members stayed behind in Australia.  Devolved began playing numerous live shows throughout Southern California and built a solid reputation by performing at famed venues such as The Whisky A Go Go, Key Club, Knitting Factory and many more. The band went through several member changes but Sankey and Noordin settled on a line-up including local Los Angeles vocalist Kyle Zemanek, bass player Hal Berkstresser and sampler Tony Sabatino.

Sankey continued contributing material for Divine Heresy and was also invited to jam with numerous other bands including Prong, All That Remains and Daughters Of Mara when those bands were searching for a permanent drummer, but Sankey would go on to focus his efforts full-time with Devolved. The band was then signed by renowned extreme metal label Unique Leader Records who decided to re-release 'Calculated' worldwide since it had only been previously available in Australia. New Vocalist Kyle Zemanek re-recorded all the vocals, and the album was re-mixed by famed producer Neil Kernon (Cannibal Corpse, Nile, Judas Priest, Nevermore, Deicide) and re-mastered by Alan Douches (Sepultura, Hatebreed, Unearth, Shadows Fall, God Forbid). It was released by Unique Leader in 2009 and Devolved performed numerous successful tours through various parts of the US.

The band then returned to Los Angeles, where Sankey co-wrote another new song with Dino Cazares (who had since returned to Fear Factory) titled 'Designing The Enemy' which was featured on the upcoming FF album 'Mechanize'. Sankey and Devolved then began writing and demoing new material for their next release. This time Sankey and Noordin collaborated with Zemanek and Berkstresser for the songwriting process and allowed them to contribute their ideas into the band's sound. Once completed the album had all the basic elements of the Devolved style but they had experimented with newer elements including some clean vocal passages by Zemanek which had not been done before on prior Devolved releases. The album titled 'Oblivion' was released worldwide in 2011 once again by Unique Leader Records. After the release Sankey decided the band would take some time off due to 'internal conflicts and creative differences' between band members. Brett Noordin decided to move back home to Australia and Sankey started work on a new thrash metal project titled 'Throne Of Ashes' with local LA guitarist David Dufour.

At this time Dino Cazares also hired Sankey once again to co-write material for the next Fear Factory album 'The Industrialist', since acclaimed drummer Gene Hoglan (Sankey's favorite drummer for many years) would not be a part of the writing and recording process for unknown reasons. Sankey spent much of the rest of the year working with Cazares and FF vocalist Burton C Bell, who had both decided they wanted to get back to the band's industrial roots and have Sankey program all the drum parts for the album. Much speculation followed that Sankey would be the new full-time drummer for Fear Factory, Sankey later stated that Cazares and Bell did in fact discuss it with him but once again visa restrictions put a stop to Sankey being able to join the band.

Sankey announced he would be moving on with Devolved on his own without any of the previous members, (although Sankey says he did speak briefly with Berkstresser about possibly collaborating on some new songs but never received any material or ideas in return so he moved on). In a bold move Sankey then began writing the next Devolved album entirely on his own, he went on to complete 12 songs with just drums and vocals, all of which he wrote, arranged and recorded himself. He then contacted Florida-based guitarist Mark Hawkins who had recorded a guest solo on the 'Oblivion' album and whose previous band had supported Devolved on a tour in the US a few years before. Hawkins wrote all the guitar parts over the existing demos and then recorded all the final guitar and bass tracks for the upcoming album. There was also a number of guest artists featured including Tony Campos (Soulfly, Prong, Ministry, Asesino, ex Static-x) and Francesco Artusato (All Shall Perish). Sankey then recruited 'Throne Of Ashes' singer Mark Haggblad to record the final vocal tracks for the album. In late 2012 Unique Leader Records released the new album which Sankey had suitably titled 'Reprisal'. The album has gone on to receive great accolades in the metal music scene, with numerous top scoring reviews and a number of inclusions in the years best albums lists on various websites and publications. 'Reprisal' has been heralded in the media as easily Devolved's best album and Sankey agrees.

John Sankey continues to be the driving force behind Devolved and is a highly recognized drummer internationally. Sankey stated the 'Throne Of Ashes' debut album is expected to be released in 2013 and he will also be working on new Devolved material. On 11 March 2013 Sankey announced a new band named Devil You Know with award-winning vocalist Howard Jones who was the singer of Killswitch Engage for over 10 years, and Francesco Artusato, acclaimed guitarist with All Shall Perish. Their debut album was released in 2014.

Discography 

Technologies (2001)
Calculated (2004)
Oblivion (2011)
Reprisal (2012)

Videography 
 Distorted (2001)
 Vex (2004)
 Fractured (2009)

Band line-up

Current members 
 John Sankey – drums, lyrics (1998–present)
 Leo Perkins – bass (2019–present)
 Arnold Arnett – guitars (2019–present)
 Simon Durrant – vocals (2020–present)
 Kris Marchant – guitars (2020–present)

Former/Touring members 
 Brett Noordin – guitars, lyrics (1998–2011)
 Leighton Kearns – bass (2002, 2005–2008)
 Nik Carpenter − lead vocals (1998–2005)
 Joel Graham − bass, vocals (1998–2001)
 Mark Walpole − guitar, effects (1998–2004)
 Wayde Dunn – bass (2003–2005)
 Patrick Brown − samples, sound manipulation (2004–2008)
 Brett Carpio – guitars (2004–2008)
 Kyle Zemanek – lead vocals (2005–2011)
 Chad Combs – vocals, samples (2005-2007)
 Hal Berkstresser – bass, effects (2008–2011)
 Anthony Sabatino – samples, keyboards (2008–2011)
 Mark Haggblad – vocals (2011–2020)
 Mark Hawkins – guitars (2011–2020), bass (2011–2019)

Timeline

See also
 Australian heavy metal
 Technical death metal

References

External links
 http://www.alternative-zine.com/interviews/en/120
 Devolved Facebook
 Devolved @ Australian Metal Guide

Australian technical death metal musical groups
Musical groups established in 1998
Queensland musical groups